Lianyungang Baitabu Airport  was a dual-use military and public airport serving the city of Lianyungang in Jiangsu Province, China. All flights were transferred to Lianyungang Huaguoshan International Airport on 2 December 2021.

See also
List of airports in China

References

External links
 Lianyungang - Baitabu (LYG / ZSLG) photos at Airliners.net

Defunct airports in China
Airports in Jiangsu
Airports established in 1985
Airports disestablished in 2021
1985 establishments in China
Buildings and structures in Lianyungang
Chinese Air Force bases